Drew Kunz (born December 9, 1969) is a poet, artist, yoga teacher, and photographer.

Kunz was born in Waukesha, Wisconsin. After a year at the Milwaukee Institute of Art and Design, Kunz transferred to the University of Wisconsin–Milwaukee to pursue both Comparative Study of Religion and Comparative Literature degrees. While in Milwaukee, Kunz and the poet Stacy Szymaszek edited the literary journal Traverse from 1999 to 2004. Since 2005, he has been involved with various projects, including the chapbook imprints g o n g press and tir aux pigeons as well as a bimonthly mail-out called SERIES. Kunz also had been a member of the Subtext Collective, a Seattle based literary group no longer active. Since his sons birth, Kunz has taught yoga and has had work in multiple showings, oftentimes alongside his friend and fellow artist Patrick Gulke.

Personal life
Drew Kunz currently lives with his family in Suquamish (dkʼʷsuqʼʷabš) located within the Port Madison Indian Reservation in Washington State.

Bibliography
 Tether (Dusie Kollektiv, 2007)
 Tether (GAMMM, 2008, bilingual edition)
 Terminals (tir aux pigeons, 2008)

External links
 Video of author (Subtext Collective)
 List of books and publications by Drew Kunz
 Webpage

American male poets
American artists
Living people
1969 births
People from Kitsap County, Washington
People from Waukesha, Wisconsin
University of Wisconsin–Milwaukee alumni
Poets from Washington (state)
Poets from Wisconsin
21st-century American poets
21st-century American male writers